Per "Pelle" Almqvist (born 29 May 1978), also known as Howlin' Pelle Almqvist, is a Swedish singer and songwriter. He is the lead singer of garage rock band The Hives.

Biography

Almqvist was born to a doctor father and a teacher mother. Almqvist and his brother Nicholaus Arson formed the band in 1993, and, according to a fictional biography about the band, attracted the attention of promoter/manager/songwriter Randy Fitzsimmons. Prior to success with the Hives he worked as a postman and a sixth-grade teacher.

Almqvist is known for being particularly animated during live shows, and his onstage antics have earned the band the title of "The best live band in the world" from Spin Magazine, which also puts Almqvist in their list of the "50 Greatest Frontmen of All Time". Some of his onstage antics include regularly mixing with the crowd, climbing on amps/ladders/stairs, and saying very ridiculous, nonsensical and seemingly arrogant things between songs.

Almqvist was previously in a relationship with Maria Andersson (lead vocalist of the Swedish rock band Sahara Hotnights) until a 2006 breakup. Since May 2010 he has been in a relationship with Catrin Nilsson.

In January 2007, Almqvist led the P3 Guld Awards.

In 2016, he presented Musikhjälpen which was broadcast from Örebro.

Almqvist is a vegetarian and an atheist.

In 2021, he took part in the sixth season of the Swedish game show Alla mot alla med Filip och Fredrik, with teammate Little Jinder.

Collaborations
Almqvist performed a collaboration with Swedish rock artist Moneybrother, a cover of an Operation Ivy song "Freeze Up". They used Swedish lyrics and called it "", which translates as "I Won't Sign Anything".  He was also the featured singer in the DJ Duo Punks Jump Up single "Dance to our Disco".

Discography

Barely Legal (1997)
Veni Vidi Vicious (2000)
Tyrannosaurus Hives (2004)
The Black and White Album (2007)
Lex Hives (2012)

References

External links 
Official website of The Hives
Official Facebook
Official MySpace

1978 births
English-language singers from Sweden
Living people
People from Fagersta Municipality
Swedish atheists
Swedish male singers
Swedish rock singers
Swedish tenors
The Hives members
21st-century Swedish singers
Swedish songwriters
People from Västanfors